Leucopogon borealis is a species of flowering plant in the heath family Ericaceae and is endemic to a restricted area of the west of Western Australia. It is an erect shrub with hairy young branchlets, linear leaves and white flowers in nine to twenty upper leaf axils.

Description
The upper surface of the leaves is shiny and the lower surface densely hairy.

Taxonomy and naming
Leucopogon borealis was first formally described in 2007 by Michael Clyde Hislop and Arthur Roy Clapham in the journal Nuytsia from specimens collected by Alex George north of Geraldton in 1993. The specific epithet (borealis) means "northern", referring to the distribution of this leucopogon, compared to others in the genus.

Distribution and habitat
This leucopogon usually grows in low, dense heath on the Moresby Range between Geraldton and Northampton in the Geraldton Sandplains bioregion in the west of Western Australia.

Conservation status
Leucopogon borealis is classified as "Priority Two" by the Western Australian Government Department of Biodiversity, Conservation and Attractions, meaning that it is poorly known and from only one or a few locations.

References

borealis
Ericales of Australia
Flora of Western Australia
Plants described in 2007